Michael Anthony Taylor (born March 26, 1991) is an American professional baseball center fielder for the Minnesota Twins of Major League Baseball (MLB). Taylor was drafted in the sixth round (172nd overall) of the 2009 MLB draft by the Washington Nationals, and made his MLB debut with them in 2014. Taylor was a member of the 2019 World Series champions. The Nationals traded Taylor to the Kansas City Royals after the 2020 season, and he won the Gold Glove Award and Fielding Bible Award in 2021.

Early life and education
Taylor was born to military parents; his father, Anthony Taylor, was a logistics officer for 22 years in the U.S. Army. Taylor has four older sisters. He was a high school teammate of Matt den Dekker, with whom he would play for the Washington Nationals in the 2015 and 2016 seasons, while attending Westminster Academy.

Career

Washington Nationals

2009–13
Taylor was signed out of Westminster Academy as a shortstop in the 2009 Major League Baseball draft, after the Washington Nationals selected him with their sixth-round pick. He forwent a commitment to the University of North Florida to go professional with the Nationals. Taylor did not make his minor league debut in the 2009 season but served as a versatile infielder for the Gulf Coast League Nationals in 2010, committing 21 errors across three positions: shortstop, second baseman, and third baseman. He appeared in 38 games and batted .195 with one home run.

At the beginning of fall instructional league play in 2010, Taylor was told he would be switching positions from shortstop to center fielder, after a hand injury had limited his development in the infield in his first year in the Nationals' minor league system. Beginning at the Class A Hagerstown Suns in 2011, Taylor exclusively appeared as an outfielder, a trend that continued with the Class A-Advanced Potomac Nationals in 2012 and 2013. His offensive output improved as well, as he batted .263 with 10 home runs in 133 games with the Potomac Nationals in 2013, earning him honors as the team's Player of the Year, before heading to Puerto Rican winter baseball to play for the Indios de Mayaguez.

Taylor was added to the Washington Nationals' 40-man roster on November 20, 2013, after the end of the 2013 season. At the time, he ranked as the Nationals' fourth-best prospect according to MLB Pipeline, and seventh-best according to Baseball America.

2014 season
On August 10, Taylor was called up by the Nationals when Steven Souza was placed on the 15-day disabled list. On August 12, he made his Major League debut against the New York Mets in Citi Field, where he collected his first major league hit, a single off pitcher Rafael Montero. He also hit his first major league home run, a two-run homer against pitcher Carlos Torres, that night. Taylor was optioned back to the AAA Syracuse Chiefs on August 23, after the Nationals selected veteran Nate Schierholtz's contract. He was again recalled after rosters expanded in September and was in center field on September 28, in the final game of the 2014 regular season, when Jordan Zimmermann completed the first no-hitter in Nationals history.

Taylor was ranked third among Nationals prospects by the end of 2014 by MLB Pipeline and second by Baseball America.

2015 season
Taylor opened the 2015 season as the Nationals' starting center fielder while Denard Span was on the disabled list. Despite starting the season well by sporting a .279 batting average, he was optioned to the Class-AAA Syracuse Chiefs on April 19 to make room on the active roster for Span. He was recalled on April 29 when Reed Johnson was placed on the disabled list. During an away game against the Arizona Diamondbacks on May 13, Taylor substituted for right fielder Bryce Harper after Harper was ejected in the seventh inning. In his first at-bat in the ninth inning, he came up with the bases loaded for the first time in his career and hit a go-ahead grand slam, effectively clinching the game for the Nationals.

On August 20, Taylor hit the second-longest home run of the 2015 MLB season, crushing a pitch from Colorado Rockies starter Yohan Flande 493 feet into the stands at Coors Field. Taylor suffered a right knee injury on August 27 after slamming into the wall while attempting to run down a line drive off the bat of Melvin Upton, Jr., but he was healthy enough to make a pinch-hitting appearance in the tenth inning against the Atlanta Braves on September 4. He hit a three-run home run for a walk-off victory over the visiting Braves.

On September 8, Taylor hit a "Little League grand slam" off of New York Mets pitcher Matt Harvey after a bases-loaded single got by center fielder Yoenis Céspedes and went to the wall. He was not credited with an inside-the-park home run, with an error being charged to Céspedes on the play. Taylor himself allowed an inside-the-park grand slam on a similar play just weeks later, as he dove and missed a ball hit by Philadelphia Phillies rookie Aaron Altherr in a September 25 game, unloading the bases and allowing Altherr to score on his own hit. The play was scored a home run for Altherr.

Taylor finished the 2015 season batting .229/.282/.358 with 14 home runs, 16 stolen bases, and a .640 on-base plus slugging percentage in 472 at bats over 138 games.

2016 season
Taylor opened the 2016 season as the Washington Nationals' fourth outfielder, but an Opening Day injury to starting center fielder Ben Revere quickly thrust him into an everyday spot in the lineup.

On June 22, Taylor had what a writer for the New England Sports Network described as possibly "the worst game in baseball history." He had five swinging strikeouts against the Los Angeles Dodgers and a fielding error that cost the Nationals the game when he failed to get his glove to the ground in time while charging a routine groundball hit by Yasiel Puig in the bottom of the ninth inning. The Nationals were up by one run, 2–3, and the error resulted in Taylor's future Nationals teammate Howie Kendrick, who was on first base for the Dodgers at the time, and Puig both scoring for a walk-off Los Angeles victory.

Taylor was optioned to the Syracuse Chiefs to make room for the reactivation of closer Jonathan Papelbon on July 4, but he was recalled after appearing in just one game for the Chiefs after first baseman Ryan Zimmerman was placed on the disabled list on July 8. Taylor's return to the major leagues was short-lived, however, as he was optioned back to Syracuse after going 0-for-4 with two strikeouts in a loss against the San Diego Padres on July 24.

Taylor rejoined the major league team after a little more than a month with the Chiefs, where he posted a meager .205 batting average over 31 games, being recalled August 29. He found himself once again relegated to a bench role, with rookie Trea Turner taking over in center field for the ineffectual Revere. He finished out the season batting .231./278/.376 with a .654 on-base plus slugging percentage, seven home runs, and 16 stolen bases in 221 at bats in 76 major league games, and he was among the players named to the Nationals' playoff roster in the 2016 National League Division Series, where he received two at-bats and struck out in both appearances.

2017 season
Coming off what he described as a "pretty disappointing" 2016 season, Taylor found himself in the familiar role of backup outfielder for the Nationals in the 2017 season, with Adam Eaton taking over in center field and Trea Turner shifting to the shortstop position. However, for the third straight season, Taylor found himself in the role of everyday center fielder after the presumptive starter was injured early in the year, with Eaton tearing ligaments in his knee while running the bases in late April. Given regular playing time, Taylor resurrected a batting average that had hovered below .200 in limited appearances prior to Eaton's season-ending injury, hitting .290 in May and June while demonstrating above-average power.

Taylor landed on the major league disabled list for the first time in his career on July 7 with an oblique strain. He spent more than a month on the disabled list, with rookie Brian Goodwin taking over as the Nationals' regular center fielder in Taylor's absence. Upon Taylor's return to the team on August 13, after rehab assignments with the minor league Potomac Nationals and Harrisburg Senators, Taylor reclaimed his spot in the starting lineup.

Two years to the day after his "Little League grand slam" against the New York Mets, on September 8, 2017, Taylor hit a bases-loaded line drive to center field off Philadelphia Phillies pitcher Jake Thompson that a leaping Odubel Herrera was unable to snare. Taylor circled the bases on the play, which was scored an inside-the-park grand slam — the first in Major League Baseball since Aaron Altherr's on September 25, 2015. In the same game, Taylor also singled twice and tripled, driving in a total of five runs, and recorded an outfield assist at home to preserve the Nationals' lead in the eventual 11–10 victory. Taylor finished the regular season batting .271/.320/.486 with 19 home runs, 53 RBIs, and 17 stolen bases in 399 at bats.

In Game 4 of the 2017 NLDS against the Chicago Cubs, Taylor hit a grand slam to put the Nationals ahead 5-0 and stave off elimination. It was the first grand slam in Nationals post-season history. Taylor hit a go-ahead three-run homer on the second inning of Game 5 (which the Nationals ultimately lost 9–8).

2018 season

In 2018 Taylor struggled at the plate to start the season, batting .223 in April and .183 in May, but hit his stride in June, batting .444. He also led the major leagues in stolen bases as late as June 21. However, Taylor lost significant playing time due to the return of Adam Eaton and the strong performance of Juan Soto, relegating Taylor to fourth outfielder status. Taylor struggled again at the plate with limited playing time in the second half of the season, and finished 2018 batting .227/.287/.357, with six home runs, 28 RBIs, and 24 stolen bases in 363 at bats.

In the 2018-2019 offseason, Taylor worked with Nationals hitting coach Kevin Long to change his stance and swing to generate more contact, and practiced his new swing in the Dominican Winter League. Nationals General Manager Mike Rizzo said in December 2018 that he believes Taylor could be a five-tool player if he can make more contact.

2019 season
In 2019 he batted .250/.305/.364 with one home run and three RBIs. In Game 2 of the 2019 World Series, Taylor hit a solo home run in the top of the ninth, becoming the 39th player to homer in their first ever World Series at-bat. With the home run the Nationals became the first team in World Series history to have a home run in the seventh, eighth and ninth innings of a game.

2020 season
After batting .196/.253/.424 with five home runs and 16 RBIs over 38 games in the shortened 2020 season, Taylor was placed on outright waivers by the Nationals. The team announced October 15, 2020, that he had cleared waivers and elected free agency rather than accept an assignment to the minor leagues.

Kansas City Royals
On November 30, 2020, Taylor signed a one-year contract worth $1.75 million with the Kansas City Royals. On September 29, 2021, Taylor signed a two-year, $9 million contract extension.

2021 season 
In 2021, Taylor batted .244/.297/.356 with 12 home runs and 54 RBIs while playing a career high 142 games. He won a Gold Glove Award and a Fielding Bible Award as a center fielder, having led all AL center fielders with 11 assists and ranked third with 351 putouts and a .992 fielding percentage.

Minnesota Twins
On January 23, 2023, Taylor was traded to the Minnesota Twins in exchange for minor league pitchers Steven Cruz and Evan Sisk.

References

External links

1991 births
Living people
African-American baseball players
Washington Nationals players
Kansas City Royals players
Gold Glove Award winners
Gulf Coast Nationals players
Hagerstown Suns players
Potomac Nationals players
Harrisburg Senators players
Syracuse Chiefs players
Indios de Mayagüez players
Major League Baseball center fielders
Baseball players from Fort Lauderdale, Florida
21st-century African-American sportspeople